The Slade Collection Vol. 2, 79-87 is a compilation album by the British rock band Slade, released in 1993 by RCA/BMG (Europe) and Polydor (UK). A sequel to the 1991 compilation The Slade Collection 81-87, it contains seventeen tracks spanning the band's career from 1979 to 1987. In 2007, Salvo released a remastered version of the compilation, along with The Slade Collection 81-87, as The Collection 79-87.

Track listing

Personnel
Slade
Noddy Holder – lead vocals, rhythm guitar
Dave Hill – lead guitar, backing vocals
Jim Lea – bass, piano, keyboards, guitar, backing vocals
Don Powell – drums

Production
Jim Lea - tracks 1-2, 4-5, 10, 12, 15
Slade - tracks 3, 6, 8-9, 14, 17
John Punter - tracks 7, 11, 13, 16

References

1993 compilation albums
Slade compilation albums
RCA Records compilation albums
Polydor Records compilation albums